Belle Marshall Kinney Scholz (1890–1959) was an American sculptor, born in Tennessee  who  worked and died in New York state.

Early life
Belle Kinney was one of four children born to Captain D.C. Kenny and Elizabeth Morrison Kenny. She was born in Nashville, Tennessee. Belle Kinney won first prize at the 1897 Tennessee Centennial Exposition for a bust of her father.

Sculpting career
At age 15, Belle Kinney was awarded a scholarship to the Art Institute of Chicago, where she studied with Lorado Taft. In 1907, at age 17, she received her first commission, to sculpt the statue of Jere Baxter, organizer of the Tennessee Central Railway. Following her work at the Art Institute, Kinney maintained a studio in Greenwich Village, during which time she met Austrian-born sculptor Leopold F. Scholz (1877–1946). They married in 1921, and completed several other works together, including the Victory statue in the War Memorial Building court at Legislative Plaza, Nashville (1929) and the bronze figure of Victory for the World War I Memorial in Pelham Bay Park, Bronx, New York City (1933). They also created both works representing Tennessee in the National Statuary Hall Collection in the US Capitol in Washington D.C.

By 1948, Kinney was  maintaining a studio in Chattanooga, Tennessee. Kinney died on August 27 or 28, 1959 at age 69 in Boiceville, Ulster County, New York.

Work

Bust of Richard Owen, Indianapolis 1913 (replica at Indiana University, Bloomington, Indiana)
Women of the Confederacy, Jackson, Mississippi (1917)
Tennessee Monument to the Women of the Confederacy, Nashville, Tennessee (1926)
Jere Baxter statue, Jere Baxter School, Nashville (1907)
Andrew Jackson statue, National Statuary Hall Collection,  U.S. Capitol, Washington D.C. (1927)
John Sevier statue, National Statuary Hall Collection, U.S. Capitol (1931)
General Joseph E. Johnston statue, Dalton, Georgia (1912)
Admiral Albert Gleaves bust, Annapolis, Maryland (1938)
Andrew Jackson bust, Tennessee State Capitol, Nashville
James K. Polk bust, Tennessee State Capitol, Nashville
John Ross bust, Hamilton County Courthouse, Chattanooga, Tennessee (1958)
Alexander P. Stewart bust,  Hamilton County Courthouse, Chattanooga, Tennessee (1911)
Victory statue, Bronx County World War I Memorial in Pelham Bay Park, New York City, with Leopold Scholz (1933)
Victory statue, War Memorial Auditorium, Legislative Plaza, Nashville, with Leopold Scholz (1929)
Pediment sculptures of the Nashville Parthenon, with Leopold Scholz (1920–30)
Bronze bust of David Crockett, Trenton, Tennessee (1950)

References

External links

Image of John Ross bust

War Memorial Statue, Tennessee State Library and Archives
War Memorial Statue, Tennessee State Library and Archives
Belle Kinney (Scholz) in her New York Studio, Tennessee State Library and Archives

1890 births
1959 deaths
20th-century American sculptors
20th-century American women artists
American women sculptors
Sculptors from Tennessee
People from Nashville, Tennessee
School of the Art Institute of Chicago alumni